Sorge may refer to:

Places 
 Sorge, Saxony-Anhalt, Germany, a village and former municipality
 Sorge (Eider) in Schleswig-Holstein, Germany, a tributary of the Eider River
 Sorge (Lake Geneva) in Lausanne, a tributary of Lake Geneva
 German name of the Dzierzgoń (river) in Poland
 Sorge Island, Antarctica

People 
 Georg Andreas Sorge (1703–1778), organist, composer and music theorist
 Friedrich Adolf Sorge (1826–1906), German communist and then American labor activist
 Henry W. Sorge (1862-1921), American politician
 Giuseppe Sorge (1857-1937), Italian historian, prefect and director of the public security
 Albert O. Sorge (1881-1967), American politician
 Reinhard Johannes Sorge (1892–1916), German dramatist and poet best known for the Expressionist play Der Bettler
 Richard Sorge (1895–1944), Soviet intelligence officer in Nazi Germany and Imperial Japan
 Santo Sorge (1908-1972), Sicilian Mafia leader
 Gustav Sorge (1911-1978), SS concentration camp guard
 Sarah Sorge (born 1969), German politician
 Tino Sorge (born 1975), German politician
 Samy Deluxe (born 1977), German hip hop artist born Samuel Sorge
 Kurt Sorge (born 1988), freeride mountain biker

Other uses 
 Sorge, or "care", a concept in Heidegger's philosophy

See also
 Sorges, a commune in France
 Sorger, a surname